The 2022 Mackay Cutters season is the 15th in the club's history. Coached by Dave Elliott and captained by Ross Bella, they compete in the Hostplus Cup.

The 2021 season marked the return of the Cutters after the 2020 season was cancelled after just one round due to the COVID-19 pandemic.

Season summary

Milestones
 Round 1: Flynn Camilleri, Ewan Coutts, Sam Fa'apito, Jake Hawkins, Tom Irelandes, Jayden Morgan Andre Niko, Zac Patch, Hiale Roycroft and Kyle Schneider made their debuts for the club.
 Round 1: Flynn Camilleri and Andre Niko scored their first tries for the club.
 Round 2: Scott Drinkwater made his debut for the club.
 Round 2: Daejarn Asi, Ewan Coutts and Scott Drinkwater scored their first tries for the club.
 Round 4: Brendan Elliot, Mitch Fogarty and Luke Ingram made their debuts for the club.
 Round 5: Matthew Vessey made his debut for the club.
 Round 6: Henri Stocks made his debut for the club.
 Round 6: Jayden Morgan and Luke Webley scored their first tries for the club. 
 Round 8: Jake Granville made his debut for the club.
 Round 9: Tom Sly made his debut for the club.
 Round 10: Tom Sly scored his first try for the club. 
 Round 14: Mitch Fogarty scored his first try for the club. 
 Round 16: Gehamat Shibasaki made his debut for the club.

2022 squad

Squad movement

Gains

Losses

Fixtures

Regular season

Statistics

References

2022 in Australian rugby league
2022 in rugby league by club
Mackay Cutters